Olean is a city in Cattaraugus County, New York, United States. Olean is the largest city in Cattaraugus County and serves as its financial, business, transportation and entertainment center. It is one of the principal cities of the Southern Tier region of Western New York.

The city is surrounded by the town of Olean and is located in the southeastern part of Cattaraugus County. The population was 13,437 in 2019 per the United States Census Bureau.

History
The first European in the area was possibly Joseph de La Roche Daillon, a missionary and explorer from Canada. La Roche reported on the presence of oil near Cuba, the first petroleum sighting in North America. At that time the area was a part of the territory of the Wenrohronon or Wenro Indians, an Iroquois speaking people. In 1643, the Wenro tribes became the first victims of a series of brutal conflicts known as the Second Beaver War.

The area was first settled by Europeans around 1765, called by the Indian name Ischua. Officially, this was illegal, as the British had declared the land in the Allegheny River watershed to be part of the Indian Reserve after conquering the territory in the French and Indian War two years prior. The surface is a hilly upland, separated into two distinct parts by the valley of the Allegheny. During the American Revolutionary War, the 1779 Sullivan Expedition established the first road to what would become Olean, blazing a trail to what is now Kittanning, Pennsylvania along the path of what is now New York State Route 16.

Originally the entire territory of the county of Cattaraugus was called the Town of Olean, formed March 11, 1808. As population allowed, the county was split in half and the top half was called "Hebe", and was taken off in 1812, a part of Perrysburgh in 1814, then Great Valley in 1818. Hinsdale formed in 1820, and Portville in 1837, leaving the current boundary of Olean that lies upon the south line of the county, near the southeast corner. The area remained sparsely populated until 1804, when Major Adam Hoops acquired the land and gave it its modern name. Hoops was a surveyor and Revolutionary War veteran, and was politically connected with Robert Morris, the financier of the Revolution. Along with Morris, Hoops became involved with the Holland Land Company, which was settling western New York.

This was a time of great western expansion into places such as Ohio and Indiana. Since neither canals nor railroads had become widespread by this point, the main means of travel was either by cart or  small-boat travel. The Allegheny River was a major transportation route. Hoops believed that a great city could be created at the confluence of the Allegheny and one of its tributaries and went looking for the right spot. In 1804 he found a spot where Olean Creek meets the river; the confluence was important as it was the farthest point downstream in the state before hitting the Seneca Reservation that surrounded most of New York's piece of the river. Hoops' brother Robert came to the site and built the first permanent structure near today's Forness Park, calling the area Hamilton in honor of Alexander Hamilton.

In a letter to Joseph Ellicott in 1804, Hoops discusses the name Olean from the local Oil Springs and the Latin word oleum:
Canandaigua, N.Y., April 15, 1804
"To Joseph ELLICOTT, Esq., Batavia, New York.
Dear Sir,―It was proposed to me at New York to drop the Indian name of Ischue or Ischua (it is also spelt other ways). Confusion might arise from the various spellings, of which to obviate all risk I have concluded so to do as proposed. The neighborhood of the oil spring suggests a name different in sound, though perhaps not different in meaning, which I wish to adopt,―it is "Olean." You will do me a favor by assisting me to establish this name. It may easily be done now by your concurrence. The purpose will be most effectually answered by employing the term, when occasion requires, without saying anything of an intended change of name. To begin, you will greatly oblige me by addressing the first letter you may have occasion to write to me, after I receive the survey, to the Mouth of Olean. The bearer being properly instructed, there will be thereafter no difficulty. Your co-operation in the matter (the effect of which, though not important in itself, may be so on account of precision) will oblige. Your servant, A. HOOPS
The Post Office recognized the new town as "Olean Point". The site was surveyed by 1808, and a map from that year shows a basic street pattern that still survives, along with most of the modern street names. In 1823, the city is called Olean, without the "Point", on county maps.

In 1854 Olean was formally incorporated by the New York State Legislature, and the trustees elected at the first subsequent town meeting were Dr. Lambert Thithney, C.B.B. Barse, Charles Thing, and John K. Comstock. Enos C. Brooks was appointed clerk of Olean.

Timber and railroads
Adam Hoops's dream of creating a major transportation hub on the Allegheny River, on the scale of a Buffalo or a Pittsburgh, was never realized and he himself died in poverty. Nonetheless, Olean prospered and was soon the central town of the region. Olean grew quickly as a transportation hub for migrants taking the Allegheny River into Ohio. For much of this era Olean was larger and better known than its northern competitor Buffalo. This period ended with the creation of the great canals, especially the Erie Canal in 1825. The Allegheny River was usually too shallow for the larger steamboats to navigate, except in the spring, and only two steamboats—the Allegheny in 1830 and the New Castle of 1837—reached the city. A Genesee Valley Canal was extended to Olean and the Allegheny River in 1862, but the Allegheny's shallowness and the rise of the railroads rendered it obsolete before it even opened.

Timber was a major industry in New York and Pennsylvania between 1830 and 1850, and Olean was the chief timber town in the region during those times. After river travel declined Olean became the regional railroad hub. The town was the crossroads of several railroads, a situation which endures into today with the Western New York and Pennsylvania Railroad.

Olean was the home of several corporations. During the late-19th century, Olean had a few mills, a bicycle company, a manufacturer of mechanical pumps and a glass works, among other factories. St. Bonaventure University was founded just outside town in 1858. Olean was incorporated as a village in 1854, and as a city in 1893. Olean was a rival of the comparably-populated, but much newer, city of Salamanca, New York at the turn of the 20th century, but the decline of the timber industry in southwestern Cattaraugus County and complications with Salamanca being situated on borrowed Seneca Nation land allowed Olean to continue growing while Salamanca declined.

Oil and rum-running
Oil was first discovered in the region by a French explorer in 1632, but it was rediscovered for commercial use during the Pennsylvania oil rush. Oil became the city's claim to fame for fifty years.

Olean was the railroad and pipeline hub for the surrounding oil region. The operations HQ of Standard Oil's New York affiliate, Socony, was based in the city. Oil produced on both sides of the state line (e.g. in Bradford, Pennsylvania) would be transported to Olean for rail travel. For a short time, Olean was the world's largest oil depot, complete with a "tank city" on the edge of town. A pipeline was also built linking the city to Standard Oil refineries in Bayonne, New Jersey. The oil industry maintained a presence in the city until 1954, the same year in which Olean's population peaked.

Oil also produced Olean's highest-ranking politician. Oil executive Frank W. Higgins was governor of New York in 1905–1907. Higgins' family owned grocery stores in the area, and Higgins also ran this business before his political career. To this day, Olean is one of the few smaller cities in New York State to be home to a governor.

Olean garnered notoriety as a major stop on bootlegging routes during Prohibition through the 1920s until 1933. Dempsey, the Chief of Police, did not condone these thugs or their illegal activities. He did not aggressively pursue arrests, however, unless he had evidence that the violator was responsible for a crime committed in his jurisdiction. As long as you kept your nose clean in the Olean City limits, it was a "safe haven". Local stories relating to this period are numerous. Some are documented and some are legends. Olean, located on a back-road route between Chicago and New York City, was often frequented by famous mobsters of the era. Al Capone of Chicago, probably the most famous gang leader of the time, visited Olean in pursuance of his illegal endeavors. Olean was nicknamed "Little Chicago" in the press, due to its connection with mobsters and bootleggers, and Capone was a frequent visitor.

Today
Olean is the largest city in Cattaraugus County. The city's population peaked at an estimated 25,000 during the mid-1950s. The current population of the city is around 15,000.

Geography
Olean is located in southeastern Cattaraugus County at  (42.08264, -78.430965).

The city is located where Olean Creek flows into the Allegheny River and by the Southern Tier Expressway (Interstate 86 and New York State Route 17). New York State Route 417 passes east–west through the city and intersects New York State Route 16, a north–south highway.

Climate

Demographics

As of the census of 2000, there were 15,347 people, 6,446 households, and 3,803 families residing in the city. The population density was 2,588.0 people per square mile (999.2/km2). There were 7,121 housing units at an average density of 1,200.8 per square mile (463.6/km2). The racial makeup of the city was 93.31% White, 3.47% Black or African American, 0.43% Native American, 0.89% Asian, 0.03% Pacific Islander, 0.43% from other races, and 1.45% from two or more races. Hispanic or Latino of any race were 1.24% of the population.

There were 6,446 households, out of which 29.1% had children under the age of 18 living with them, 42.0% were married couples living together, 13.2% had a female householder with no husband present, and 41.0% were non-families. 35.3% of all households were made up of individuals, and 14.1% had someone living alone who was 65 years of age or older. The average household size was 2.29 and the average family size was 2.97.

In the city, the population was spread out, with 24.6% under the age of 18, 8.0% from 18 to 24, 27.2% from 25 to 44, 22.3% from 45 to 64, and 17.9% who were 65 years of age or older. The median age was 38 years. For every 100 females, there were 88.1 males. For every 100 females age 18 and over, there were 84.3 males.

The median income for a household in the city was $30,400, and the median income for a family was $38,355. Males had a median income of $32,341 versus $22,469 for females. The per capita income for the city was $17,169. About 13.9% of families and 15.9% of the population were below the poverty line, including 20.5% of those under age 18 and 10.2% of those age 65 or over.

Economy

 Cutco is headquartered in Olean and manufactures all of its knives in the city.
 Dresser-Rand's North American headquarters was in Olean.
 Hysol Corporation, later bought by Dexter Corporation and then Henkel was one of Olean's largest employers. Henkel sold the company to SolEpoxy in 2010.
 Colonial Radio Group was headquartered in Olean from 2009 to 2018. It has since exited the region and moved to the Carolinas.
 Olean General Hospital, is part of Upper Allegheny Health System (UAHS), which includes Bradford Regional Medical Center (BRMC) in Bradford, Pennsylvania. UAHS provides care to a service area with more than 160,000 individuals in Southwestern New York and Northwestern Pennsylvania.
 Olean Wholesale Grocery, a regional grocery wholesaler, was located just east of the city. It was bought out by C&S Wholesale Grocers with intent to close the facility in 2019.

Education
Olean has two elementary schools, East View Elementary and Washington West Elementary; a middle school, Olean Intermediate Middle School; and Olean High School is the city's public high school. It was the site of the Olean High School shooting in 1974.

Archbishop Walsh Academy is Olean's Roman Catholic school for grades K-12.

A branch of Jamestown Community College is within the city. St. Bonaventure University is a few miles to the west in the town of Allegany.

Sports

Bradner Stadium, originally built in the 1920s, is a multi-purpose stadium which for years was once the home to the minor-league baseball teams the Olean Oilers. However, in 2012 the Olean Oilers were recreated. The Oilers currently play in the NYCBL League and won the League Championship in 2015 and 2016.

Between 1908 and 1916, Olean hosted minor league baseball preceding the Oilers. The Olean Refiners played as a member of the Class D level Interstate League. Beginning in 2017, the "Olean Oilers," have continued play in the New York Collegiate League, a summer collegiate baseball league.

Olean is also the home of the Southern Tier Diesel adult amateur football team.

Bradner Stadium also hosts the Olean High School football team. The Huskies play all of their home games in the stadium located in East Olean.

Historic sites
The following are listed on the National Register of Historic Places: Beardsley-Oliver House, Conklin Mountain House, Oak Hill Park Historic District, Olean Armory, Olean Public Library, Olean School No. 10, St. Stephen's Episcopal Church Complex, Temple B'Nai Israel, Union and State Streets Historic District, and the United States Post Office.

The Church of St Mary of the Angels on Henley Street was built in 1915 and was designated by Pope Francis as a basilica in 2017.

Transportation
Interstate 86 spans east–west and is to the northern edge of Olean. New York Route 16 heads north from Olean to Buffalo. New York Route 417 heads east from Olean. Until 1968, the Pennsylvania Railroad operated the Buffalo Day Express heading north from Washington, D.C., through Olean to Buffalo (the Baltimore Day Express operated on the southbound version of the route). The Penn Central railroad operated an unnamed successor train through Olean from Harrisburg, Pennsylvania to Buffalo between 1968 and May 1, 1971, when passenger train service in the region ended with the inception of Amtrak.

Since 2001, the former Erie Lackawanna Railway mainline between Hornell, NY and Meadville, PA has been operated by the Western New York and Pennsylvania Railroad, a shortline railroad that has also operated portions of the former Pennsylvania Railroad Buffalo Line, both north and south of its Olean headquarters, since 2007.

Until January 6, 1970, the Erie Lackawanna Railroad operated through Olean with the Chicago - Hoboken, New Jersey " Lake Cities": the last passenger train to traverse the entire Southern Tier.

The nearest general commercial airports with scheduled flights for the public are in Erie, Buffalo and the Elmira area.

Notable people

Sports 
 Claude Allen, Olympic athlete
 George Capwell, soccer manager
 Eddie Donovan, New York Knicks head coach (1961–1965), head coach, St. Bonaventure University, 1954–1961
 Bob Lanier, Basketball Hall of Fame player, St. Bonaventure University player (1967–1970), Detroit Pistons player (1970–1980), Milwaukee Bucks (1980–1984)
 John McGraw, Baseball Hall of Fame player and manager
 John Wojcik, former MLB player
 Louis Zamperini, World War II prisoner of war survivor, inspirational speaker, and former American competitor in the Olympics.

Arts 
 Beverly Bower, opera singer
 Bill Easley, saxophonist
 JG Faherty, science fiction author
 Jeff Fahey, actor
 Donald Innis, architect who invented the floating airport
 Bobby Johnston, film composer, musician
 Robert Lax, poet
 Grace Marra, musician
 Thomas Merton, religious writer
 Meg Saligman, muralist
 Jon Serl, folk artist
 Tom Stephan (aka Superchumbo), remix artist
 Peter Tomarken, host of the game show Press Your Luck, was born and grew up in Olean
 Clifford Ulp, art professor

Politics 
 Augustus Barrows, Wisconsin lumberman and legislator
 Chauncey J. Fox, New York State senator
 Edward M. Gabriel, United States ambassador to Morocco
 James F. Hastings, Republican U.S. congressman, 1969–1976
 Frank W. Higgins, 35th governor of New York from 1905 to 1906
 Frederick S. Martin, early Republican congressman
 Timothy H. Porter, 19th-century U.S. Congressman
 Heather Tully, nurse and member of the West Virginia House of Delegates
 James C. Willson, 12th mayor of Flint, Michigan
 Catharine Young, New York state senator

Other 
 George G. Lundberg, pilot
 Joe Mayer, founder of the town of Mayer, Arizona
 Hamilton Hobart Stow, oil well operator

See also
 Radio stations in the Olean market
 National Register of Historic Places listings in Cattaraugus County, New York

References

External links

 City of Olean official website
 

Populated places established in 1765
Cities in New York (state)
Cities in Cattaraugus County, New York
1765 establishments in the Province of New York